The Curaçaoan records in swimming are the fastest ever performances of swimmers from Curaçao, which are recognised and ratified by the Curaçao Aquatics Association.

Long course (50 m)

Men

Women

Short course (25m)

Men

|-bgcolor=#DDDDDD
|colspan=9|
|-

|-bgcolor=#DDDDDD
|colspan=9|
|-

|-bgcolor=#DDDDDD
|colspan=9|
|-

|-bgcolor=#DDDDDD
|colspan=9|
|-

Women

|-bgcolor=#DDDDDD
|colspan=9|
|-

|-bgcolor=#DDDDDD
|colspan=9|
|-

|-bgcolor=#DDDDDD
|colspan=9|
|-

|-bgcolor=#DDDDDD
|colspan=9|
|-

Mixed relay

References

External links
 Curaçao Aquatics Association web site

National records in swimming
Swimming records
Records